The Waterless Sea is the second book in the Chanters of Tremaris trilogy by Kate Constable.

Premise
Having defeated the sorcerer Samis in the previous book, The Singer of All Songs, Calwyn and her friends encounter Heben, an exiled princeling, who tells them that children, including his siblings, are being kidnapped and imprisoned for practicing magic. The group sets off for the desert of Merithuros to rescue the captured children.

Reception
The book received mixed reviews from critics. Timnah Card, writing for The Bulletin of the Center for Children's Books, described it as a "fast-moving epic" that fantasy fans would enjoy, but criticized the "blandness of Calwyn's character". Melissa Moore of the School Library Journal concurred, commenting that some of the secondary characters were "flat" and that parts of the plot were predictable, but still praised it as an "excellent fantasy" and more well written than the first book in the series.

References

2003 Australian novels
Australian fantasy novels